Samuel Walker Houston (February 12, 1864November 19, 1945) was an American pioneer in the field of education.

Early life 
On February 12, 1864, Samuel Walker Houston was a Texas Education pioneer.  Born a slave in Huntsville, Texas. Houston's father was Joshua Houston, and his mother was Sylvester Baker  two former slaves of General Sam Houston Sam Houston.

Career 

After studying with his father and Professor CW Luckett, Samuel W. Houston realized that  education was the building block to success.  A member of the intellectual elite, he was influenced by Booker T. Washington.  Young Samuel matriculated to study in Virginia, then to Atlanta University in Georgia, where he was a student of W.E.B. DuBois before moving on to Howard University in Washington D.C.

While in DC, Houston honed administrative skills, working for 5 years as a clerk for the Navy.

1903: Instructor Houston returned home to Texas to teach at the Red Hill Community School in Grimes County, TX.  He also  founded and published a local newspaper: The Huntsville Times.

Houston founded the Galilee Community School in 1906, which later became known as the Houstonian Normal and Industrial Institute, in

1906: Professor Houston founded Galilee Community School—Texas' first  1-12th grade school academy for African-Americans—on land donated by the  Melinda and Sanford Williams family. The Galilee Community School later grew and morphed into the Samuel W. Houston Industrial and Training Institute in  Walker County where vocational skills were taught to classes that included vocatIona and fine art classes.  Funding from the community and outside sources, including substantial grants from the Julius Rosenwald Fund for  the construction of 2 dormitories housing up to 400 boys and girls, the  property on Highway 30 was a source of community pride.

In 1930, Houston's school was consolidated into the Huntsville Independent School District.  Samuel W. Houston was named supervising principal over nine Walker County schools, including the Samuel W. Houston High School for black students.

The Rosenwald Fund's generous grants were  joined by  monies and support from the Jeanes Fund, the Slater Fund, Smith Hughes, Smith-Level and the General Education Board of New York provided generous grants to support not only the construction of buildings but the teaching of music, arts and the humanities as well.  Prof. Houston was a prolific musician and took full advantage of their generosity towards his students.

The Rosenwald Fund's special agent G.T. Bludworth was instrumental in helping to ensure the expansion of the institute to 5 dormitories and 2 academic buildings.

1935: Professor Houston served as the Commissioner of Interracial Cooperation; was Field Secretary and Director of the State Interracial Commission of Texas; and later as the Walker County Superintendent for persons of color.  He eventually became the  supervising principal over nine Walker County schools and first principal of the aptly named Samuel W. Houston High School which later became the Samuel Walker Houston Elementary School.

1995: The creation of "The Dreamers," a monument to underscore the contributions made by the black community in the growth and development of Huntsville and Walker County.  The work of art was commissioned by the Huntsville Independent School District,  Huntsville Arts Commission and the Samuel W. Houston High School's Ex-Students Association. 

Source:  “Pathfinders: A history of the pioneering efforts of African-Americans, Huntsville, Walker County, Texas" by Naomi W. Lede’

Personal life 
Samuel Walker Houston first married Cornelia Orvis, the daughter of Rev. and Mrs. Orvis. They had a son, Harold Houston.  Later, the mother and a baby daughter died in childbirth.

April 18, 1915: Samuel W Houston and fellow instructor Hope Harville wed. They raised three children:  Samuel W. Houston Jr., (5/9/1916), Helen Hope (8/25/1917), Hazel Sylvester (9/30/1919)

On November 19, 1945, Houston died  at the age of 81, while staying in the home of Constance Houston in Houston Texas.

Legacy 

1935: Professor Houston served as the Commissioner of Interracial Cooperation; was Field Secretary and Director of the State Interracial Commission of Texas; and later as the Walker County Superintendent for persons of color.  He eventually became the  supervising principal over nine Walker County schools and first principal of the aptly named Samuel W. Houston High School which later became the Samuel Walker Houston Elementary School.

November 19, 1945, Samuel W. Houston died at the age of 81 and was buried in Huntsville's Oakwood Cemetery where his father, Joshua Houston, Aunt Virginia Houston Wilson and namesake, General Sam Houston are all interred.

In 1995, on the grounds of the old Samuel W. Houston Elementary School, the Huntsville Independent School District, along with the Huntsville Arts Commission and the high school's Ex-Students Association, commissioned artists Larry Zink and Monica Taylor to create The Dreamers, a monument to underscore the contributions made by the black community in the growth and development of Huntsville and Walker County was placed in front of the old facility, now renamed as the Samuel W. Houston Museum and Cultural Centerhttps://rosenwaldacres.com/samuel-w-houston-museum.

References

 “Pathfinders: A history of the pioneering efforts of African-Americans, Huntsville, Walker County, Texas" by Naomi W. Lede’

External links
Samuel Walker Houston at Handbook of Texas Online

People from Huntsville, Texas
1945 deaths
1864 births